The Netherlands Reformed Churches are a conservative Reformed Protestant Christian denomination in the Kingdom of the Netherlands. The denomination came into existence in 1967 out of a schism within the Reformed Churches in the Netherlands (Liberated).

Since 2017, the denomination has been in the process of merging with the Reformed Churches in the Netherlands (Liberated), which together hope to form, on March 1, 2023, the Dutch Reformed Churches, a new denomination.

History
The Netherlands Reformed Churches has a history that coincides to a great extent with that of the Reformed Churches (Liberated) of which it was a part until the early 1960s. The latter denomination arose out of a conflict within the Reformed Churches in the Netherlands over the covenant and the power of the general synod. After that schism, referred to as the Liberation (Dutch Vrijmaking), the Liberated churches became a very conservative and orthodox denomination. Wary of the liberal tendencies within various Reformed denominations, they started to develop a number of cultural and political structures and institutes, whose membership was restricted to church members. Some in the church held the view that the Liberated church was the only true church in the Netherlands and implied that all other Christians were in violation of God's command to be joined to God's covenant people. A sizeable group disagreed with that view.

In 1964, the disagreement came to a head, when Rev. Van der Ziel was accused of errors in his teaching and was found guilty by the synod of the Reformed Churches (Liberated), which defrocked him. Many members protested that measure and in 1966 drew up an open letter with a petition to voice their protest. However, local church councils responded by excommunicating members who had signed the petition. Those members and many who followed them voluntarily formed a new group.

The new federation of Reformed Churches was referred to as buitenverbanders (literally "those outside the denomination") until 1979, when the current name, Netherlands Reformed Churches, was adopted.

Doctrine and practice
In teaching, the Netherlands Reformed Churches are in many ways an orthodox Reformed Church. They hold to the traditional confessions of the ancient church (the Nicene Creed, the Apostles' Creed, and the Athanasian Creed), as well as the Three Forms of Unity. As a Calvinist church, they practice infant baptism.

However, the denomination is very loosely organised. As a result of the bad experiences with synodical authority, the local congregations have much more power and the general synod much less than in most other Reformed churches. Thus there are many variations and differences between local congregations. Some are very traditional; others are more heavily influenced by contemporary evangelical practices and have replaced traditional Dutch organ music with praise bands. Also, the synod of the Netherlands Reformed Churches has recently allowed women to serve as deacons, elders, and pastors, but most local churches do not allow that. Such variations have made contacts with other churches somewhat more complicated. There have been close contacts with the Reformed Churches in the Netherlands (Liberated), but the widespread desire to be reunited to each other has been hampered by deep-running disagreements over both doctrine and practice.

The Netherlands Reformed Churches are also close to the Christian Reformed Churches. After the formation of the Protestant Church in the Netherlands, two protesting congregations from the former Reformed Churches in the Netherlands joined the Netherlands Reformed Church.

Statistics 
The Netherlands Reformed Churches had 33,030 members in 2011, about 20,975 are communicants, and 12,045 are non-communicants. This church statistic means a growth of more than 392 in the last year. The church was served by 86 pastors. Since 1985 the office of deacons are open to women, and since 2004 elders can be women too. In 31 congregation all ministries and positions open for women, 16 congregations elders and deacons can be women, in 16 churches the office of deacon, and in 20 congregation no women officers are allowed.

Missions 
The Netherlands Reformed Congregations have missions in Nqutu in South Africa, and mission in Sumba in Indonesia. It also has a translating Reformed literature agency, this was the Spanish Work in Latin America. The church maintains relations with denominations in Hungary and Romania. In France they support the National Union of Independent Reformed Evangelical Churches of France. These missions are supported by the congregations.

The national magazine of the church is Opbouw (construction).

References

External links 
 

 
Christian organizations established in 1967
Reformed denominations in the Netherlands
Calvinist denominations established in the 20th century
1967 establishments in the Netherlands